Hammerschmidtia ferruginea , the Aspen hover fly, is a rare, species of syrphid fly. It has been observed in Canada, Alaska and the northern United States. Hoverflies get their names from the ability to remain nearly motionless while in flight. The adults are also known as flower flies for they are commonly found around and on flowers, from which they get both energy-giving nectar and protein-rich pollen. Larvae for this genus are of the rat-tailed type. Hammerschmidtia ferruginea larvae have been described by Rotheray.

Description
Hammerschmidtia ferruginea is a large (10–12 mm) orange-brown hoverfly with a feathered  arista. It resembles Brachyopa and Hammerschmidtia was in the past a subgenus of  Brachyopa. In general  appearance it is more like a dryomyzid or sciomyzid than a  syrphid.
 The larva is illustrated in colour by Rotheray.

Distribution
Scotland east through Northern and Central Europe then to Central Asia, Siberia and on to the Pacific. In North America Alaska south to Arizona.

Habitat
Pinus or Betula, and Quercus forest with overmature Populus tremula. It is a bioindicator.

Biology
Adults may be found sitting on trunks of Betula and old Populus tremula, or on nearby logs and stumps . Flowers visited include white umbellifers, Crataegus, Ranunculus and Salix and choke cherry. They fly from the end of May until the end of July. 
.

References

External links
 Images reprenting Hammerschmidtia ferruginea

Diptera of Europe
Eristalinae
Insects described in 1817
Taxa named by Carl Fredrik Fallén